The 2020 Metro Manila Film Festival (MMFF) is the 46th edition of the annual Metro Manila Film Festival. It is organized by the Metropolitan Manila Development Authority (MMDA). It is the first edition of the festival to be held online due to the COVID-19 pandemic, and also the first to make its entries available to an audience outside the Philippines as part of the festival's official run.

Impact of the COVID-19 pandemic
Due to the COVID-19 pandemic, the 2020 Metro Manila Film Festival was modified into a digital event. The Metropolitan Manila Development Authority (MMDA) announced on November 24, 2020, that the film festival would go digital due to the government implementation community quarantine classifications in the Metro area, in partnership with Upstream and GMovies, a streaming provider and ticket provider respectively, to stream the official entries. The festival is also co-presented by the telecommunications company Globe Telecom.

The Parade of Stars and the Gabi ng Parangal (Awards Night), both part of the annual MMFF, will also be streamed online in compliance with health and safety protocols for COVID-19. This annual event is primarily to promote and enhance the preservation of the Philippine cinema. The proceeds from the film festival will go to a number of beneficiaries in the film industry. The Parade of the Stars, the film festival's traditional float motorcade, was also modified due to the pandemic.

Some of the entry films were released in cinemas after the official run of the 2020 MMFF already such as Pakboys Takusa that was released on January 8, Suarez: The Healing Priest on January 15 and Magikland on February 12 in select cinemas.

Entries

Feature films

Previously, the Metro Manila Film Festival usually had eight feature films as official entries which are screened in cinemas across the Philippines. However, due to the COVID-19 pandemic, which forced the temporary closure of cinemas in the country, the film festival was modified and all entries were streamed online instead. The number of entries was also expanded to ten from eight, with all ten entries being announced on November 24, 2020. The ten films part of the "digital" film festival were made available starting December 25, through Upstream. The official run of the film festival will be until January 8, 2021.

The film festival entries were also made available to people outside the Philippines. The move was made specifically with the Overseas Filipino Workers demographic in mind.

Previous entries
Prior to the changes made to transform the 2020 Metro Manila Film Festival into a digital event, it was planned that this edition of the film festival was to have eight official entries as customarily done. The MMDA announced four films, supposed to be the first of eight entries, was announced to be part of the 2020 film festival on July 17, 2020, despite cinemas in the country already closed at the time due to COVID-19 pandemic. These films were selected based on submitted scripts.

However, only one of those first entries made it through the official entries by November, namely Brightlight's Magikland. Several of the entries for the December festival were entries for the proposed MMFF Summer edition, which did not push through because of the pandemic.

The following table lists the three previously-announced entries that are no longer part of the film festival.

Short films
A short film competition for students was organized as part of the film festival. An undetermined number of entries were originally part of the short film competition of the cancelled 2020 Metro Manila Summer Film Festival. Like their feature film counterparts, the entries were made available online through Upstream.

Parade of Stars
The Parade of Stars was held as a virtual event prior to the film festival's official opening day. Traditionally, the event is organized as a float parade but the event was instead held as a 4-hour virtual event. The 2020 MMFF was opened by MMDA Chairman Danilo Lim and Quezon City Mayor Joy Belmonte since Quezon City is the designated host of the film festival. The cast and director of each of the MMFF's ten official entry films answered questions from the audience and select members of the media. As part of a "virtual" parade, a "virtual" float was featured prior to each of the ten official entries' segment.

Streaming
The official entries for the 2020 Metro Manila Film Festival were not screened in cinemas, which were closed due to the COVID-19 pandemic. Instead, the films were made available online through transactional video on demand platform, Upstream. Tickets for the films were made available through GMovies, a payment platform by Globe Telecom. Tickets were made available for purchase starting December 7 for patrons based in the Philippines and on December 18 for people outside the country but the films themselves were only watchable starting December 25, 2020, the official opening day of the film festival. The films is available to stream up to five days after ticket purchase, but once the film was played, the certain media is only viewable for 24 hours. The films can be rewatched for unlimited times within said 24-hour period from the first playback.

Awards

The Gabi ng Parangal of the 2020 Metro Manila Film Festival was held virtually on December 27, 2020. The awards night was hosted by Marco Gumabao and Kylie Verzosa from Globe Telecom's Project Space studio in Makati.

Awardees were announced via the MMDA's Official Facebook Page. The nominees were announced on December 24, 2020.

Major awards
Winners are listed first, highlighted in boldface, and indicated with a double dagger. Nominations are also listed if applicable.

Other awards
 Manay Ichu Vera-Perez Maceda Memorial Award – Gloria Romero

Short Film category
Best Student Short Film – Paano Maging Babae from De La Salle–College of Saint Benilde

Multiple awards

Multiple nominations

Box office gross
No official figures or film rankings was immediately released regarding the box office gross of the 2020 Metro Manila Film Festival entries. According to Quezon City Representative Alfred Vargas, during a House of Representatives probe on online piracy of the 2020 MMFF entries, claimed that the 2020 MMFF entries grossed only  in total.

Notes

References

Metro Manila Film Festival
MMFF
MMFF
MMFF
MMFF
MMFF
December 2020 events in the Philippines
January 2021 events in the Philippines
Metro Manila